FMU can refer to:

Universities
 Faisalabad Medical University, in Faisalabad, Punjab, Pakistan
 Fakir Mohan University, in Balasore, Odisha, India
 Florida Memorial University, in Miami, Florida, United States
 Florida Metropolitan University, now Everest University
 Francis Marion University, in Florence, South Carolina, United States
 Fukushima Medical University, in Japan

Other uses
 16S rRNA (cytosine967-C5)-methyltransferase
 Federated Moulders' (Metals) Union of Australia, now defunct
 Financial Monitoring Unit, an agency of the government of Pakistan
 Florence Municipal Airport, in Oregon, United States
 Freight multiple unit
 Functional Mock-up Unit, a library representing a simulation model, also the file extension ".fmu" containing model data
 Muria language
 "FMU", a song by Brooke Candy featuring Rico Nasty from the album Sexorcism